Neelakannukal is a 1974 Indian Malayalam film, directed by Madhu. The film stars Madhu, Jayabharathi, KPAC Lalitha and Adoor Bhasi in the lead roles. The film has musical score by G. Devarajan.

Cast

Madhu as Kunjiraman
Jayabharathi as Malu 
KPAC Lalitha as Mariyamma
Adoor Bhasi as Udakku Velu 
Manavalan Joseph as Porinju
Sankaradi as Mathew Sakhavu 
Sukumaran as Sreedharan
Aryad Gopalakrishnan as Kochappi
Bahadoor as Mammu
Jameela Malik as Jaanu
KPAC Sunny as Cheriyan muthalali 
Paravoor Bharathan as Vijayan
Thoppil Krishna Pillai as Antony
Azeez as Police officer
Kaviyoor Ponnamma as Chellamma
Kedamangalam Ali as Kumaran
TP Radhamani as Komalam

Soundtrack
The music was composed by G. Devarajan and the lyrics were written by O. N. V. Kurup and Vayalar Ramavarma.

References

External links
 

1974 films
1970s Malayalam-language films